A seminar is a form of academic instruction, either at an academic institution or offered by a commercial or professional organization. It has the function of bringing together small groups for recurring meetings, focusing each time on some particular subject, in which everyone present is requested to participate. This is often accomplished through an ongoing Socratic dialogue with a seminar leader or instructor, or through a more formal presentation of research. It is essentially a place where assigned readings are discussed, questions can be raised and debates can be conducted.

Etymology
The word seminar was borrowed from German (always capitalized, as a common noun, as Seminar), and is ultimately derived from the Latin word seminarium, meaning "seed plot" (an old-fashioned term for “seedbed”). Its root word is semen (Latin for "seed").

Overview

The term seminar is also used to describe a research talk, often given by a visiting researcher and primarily attended by academics, research staff, and postgraduate students. Seminars often occur in regular series, but each seminar is typically given by a different speaker, on a topic of that speaker's choosing. Such seminars are not usually a part of a course of study and are therefore not usually associated with any assessment or credit.

In some European universities, a seminar may be a large lecture course, especially when conducted by a renowned thinker (regardless of the size of the audience or the scope of student participation in discussion). Some non-English speaking countries in Europe use the word seminar (e.g. German Seminar, Slovenian seminar, Polish seminarium) to refer to a university class that includes a term paper or project, as opposed to a lecture class (e.g. German Vorlesung, Slovenian predavanje, Polish wykład). This does not correspond to the English use of the term. In some academic institutions, typically in scientific fields, the term "preceptorial" is used interchangeably with "seminar".

In North Indian universities, the term "seminar" refers to a course of intense study relating to the student's major. Seminars typically have significantly fewer students per professor than normal courses, and are generally more specific in topic of study. Seminars can revolve around term papers, exams, presentations, and several other assignments. Seminars are almost always required for university graduation. Normally, participants must not be beginners in the field under discussion at US and Canadian universities. Seminar classes are generally reserved for upper-class students, although at UK and Australian universities seminars are often used for all years. The idea behind the seminar system is to familiarize students more extensively with the methodology of their chosen subject and also to allow them to interact with examples of the practical problems that always occur during research work.

Seminar rooms

"Seminar room" is often used as a name for a generic group study or work space at a library. Some seminar rooms are more tailored to a specific topic or field, literally a space designed for a seminar course or individualized self-study to occur.

See also

 Academic conference
 French mathematical seminars
 Plenary session
 Poster session
 Senior seminar, aka Capstone course or final year course
 Symposium (academic)
 Webinar (a seminar attended through the Internet)

References

Academic terminology